Hampstead Road may refer to:

 Hampstead Road, Adelaide
 Hampstead Road, London
 Primrose Hill railway station, the disused railway station in London that opened with this name